Minuscule 210 (in the Gregory-Aland numbering), A133 (Soden), is a Greek minuscule manuscript of the New Testament, on parchment. Palaeographically it has been assigned to the 11th or 12th century. It has marginalia.

Description 

The codex contains almost complete text of the four Gospels, on 372 parchment leaves (size ). The text is written in one column per page, in various number of lines per page.
It has only one lacunae in Matthew 1:1-2:18, it was supplied by a later hand.

 
It contains pictures. The biblical text is surrounded by a (Catenae). In the Gospel of Mark, the commentary is by Victorinus of Pettau. There are rich blue and gold illuminations and pictures of Saint Mark and Luke.

Text 

The Greek text of the codex is a representative of the Byzantine text-type. Aland placed it in Category V.

It was not examined by using the Claremont Profile Method.

History 

It was examined by Birch and Burgon. C. R. Gregory saw it in 1886.

It is currently housed at the Biblioteca Marciana (Fondo ant. 27), at Venice.

See also 

 List of New Testament minuscules
 Biblical manuscript
 Textual criticism

References

Further reading 

 

Greek New Testament minuscules
12th-century biblical manuscripts